Coleophora levantis is a moth of the family Coleophoridae. It is found on the island of Honshu in Japan.

The wingspan is 11–14 mm. Adults are on wing in July.

The larvae feed on Quercus mongolica grosserata and Quercus serrata. Young larvae feed on sprouting buds of their host plant in spring. They create a case for hibernation; it is of the curved sheath-type and is 4–5 mm long, smooth and light brownish grey. 

Older larvae create another case in spring and feed on the upper surface of the leaves without making mines. This case is of the tubular type and 6–7 mm long, almost straight and covered with light greyish-yellow hairs.

References

levantis
Moths described in 1988
Moths of Japan